Jerry's may refer to:

Jerry's Famous Deli, a delicatessen chain in Southern California and Florida
Jerry's Foods, owner of several grocery store chains, headquartered in Edina, Minnesota
Jerry's Subs & Pizza, a fast casual sandwich and pizza restaurant chain in the Washington, D.C. area
Jerry's Restaurants, formerly located in the Midwest and Southern U.S., now mostly converted to Denny's restaurants

See also
 Jerry (disambiguation)